Mackenzie South is a former territorial electoral district, that elected members to the Northwest Territories Legislative Assembly in Canada.

The electoral district covered the communities of Fort Smith, Hay River, Pine Point, Fort Resolution, Talston River, Snowdrift, Fort Reliance and Wynn's Sawmill.

1954 election

1951 election

References

Former electoral districts of Northwest Territories